Marco D'Alessandro (born 17 February 1991) is an Italian professional footballer who plays as a winger for  club Monza.

Club career

Roma and loans 
D'Alessandro moved his first footsteps into Lazio youth system. In 2005, he joined Roma youth teams. On 21 March 2009 he made his senior debut in Serie A as an injury time substitute against Juventus, which Roma lost 4–1.

In July 2009, he was sent to Serie B side Grosseto on a season-long loan to gain first-team experience. Grosseto also had option to co-own the player for €200,000. In June 2010 Roma activated the counter-option to pay Grosseto €350,000.

In July 2010, he was sent to Serie A side Bari in temporary deal for €300,000, with option to co-own the player for €1.5 million. Then in January 2011 he was sent to Serie B side Livorno.

In August 2011, he was sent to Serie B club Verona, with option to sign him for undisclosed fee. On 10 January 2012 he scored a goal against Lazio in Italian Cup. In June 2012 Roma activated the counter-option again, for €100,000.

In 2012, he left for Serie B club Cesena in temporary deal with option to co-own the player for €700,000. The loan was extended on 8 July 2013. Cesena also had option to sign him in co-ownership for €800,000. In June 2014 Roma activated the counter-option again for €500,000.

Atalanta and loans 
On 4 July 2014, fellow Serie A club Atalanta signed D'Alessandro outright from Roma for €2 million.

On 18 July 2017, he moved to Serie A club Benevento, on a one-season loan with an obligation to make the deal permanent.

On 17 August 2018, D'Alessandro joined to Serie A side Udinese on a season-long loan, in a deal that saw Ali Adnan moving to Atalanta in exchange.

SPAL 
On 10 July 2019, D'Alessandro joined SPAL on loan with an obligation to buy.

Monza 
On 27 January 2021, D'Alessandro signed with Serie B club Monza on a two-and-a-half-year contract. He made his debut on 6 February, coming on as a substitute in a 1–1 draw against Empoli. On 9 February, D'Alessandro scored a goal and made an assist as a substitute, helping Monza win 2–1 away to Vicenza. On 23 October, D'Alessandro scored from a last-minute counter attack against Cittadella; Monza won 1–0.

International career
D'Alessandro was in the Italy U-19 team that took part at the 2010 Euro U-19 Championship. He was sent off in the first match. On 17 November 2010, he made his debut with the Italy U-21 team in a friendly match against Turkey.

Personal life 
D'Alessandro and his wife Corinne have two children.

Career statistics

Club

References

External links
 Profile at A.C. Monza 
 
 

1991 births
Living people
Footballers from Rome
Italian footballers
Association football midfielders
Serie A players
Serie B players
A.S. Roma players
F.C. Grosseto S.S.D. players
S.S.C. Bari players
U.S. Livorno 1915 players
Hellas Verona F.C. players
A.C. Cesena players
Atalanta B.C. players
Benevento Calcio players
Udinese Calcio players
S.P.A.L. players
A.C. Monza players
Italy youth international footballers
Italy under-21 international footballers